Marián Vanderka (born 18 April 1972) is a Slovak sprinter. He competed in the men's 200 metres at the 2000 Summer Olympics. He also competed in the four-man bobsleigh at the 2002 Winter Olympics.

See also
 List of athletes who competed in both the Summer and Winter Olympic games

References

1972 births
Living people
Athletes (track and field) at the 2000 Summer Olympics
Bobsledders at the 2002 Winter Olympics
Slovak male sprinters
Slovak male bobsledders
Olympic athletes of Slovakia
Olympic bobsledders of Slovakia
Sportspeople from Ružomberok